Valdrin Mustafa (born 11 March 1998) is a professional footballer who plays as a centre-forward for  club SV Elversberg. Born in Germany, he has represented Albania and Kosovo internationally at youth levels.

Club career

SC Verl
On 25 May 2021, Mustafa signed a two-year contract with 3. Liga club SC Verl and this transfer would become legally effective in July 2021. Two month later, he was named as a SC Verl substitute for the first time in a league match against Türkgücü München. His debut with SC Verl came on 18 August in the 2021–22 Westphalian Cup first round against SG Wattenscheid 09 after being named in the starting line-up.

SV Elversberg
On 31 August 2021, Mustafa signed a two-year contract with Regionalliga Südwest club SV Elversberg. Four days later, he made his debut in a 2–1 away win against 1899 Hoffenheim II after coming on as a substitute at 64th minute in place of Nico Karger. Ten days after debut, Mustafa scored his first goal for SV Elversberg in his third appearance for the club in a 2–0 away win over Astoria Walldorf in Regionalliga Südwest.

International career
From 2016, until 2017, Mustafa has been part of Albania at youth international level, respectively has been part of the U19, U20, and U21 teams and he with these teams played nine matches and scored one goal.

On 7 August 2019, the Football Federation of Kosovo announced that Mustafa had decided to represent their country. On 2 September 2019, he received a call-up from Kosovo U21 for the 2021 UEFA European Under-21 Championship qualification match against England U21, and made his debut after coming on as a substitute at 46th minute in place of Mirlind Daku.

References

External links

1998 births
Living people
People from Merzig-Wadern
Kosovan footballers
Kosovo under-21 international footballers
Albanian footballers
Albania youth international footballers
Albania under-21 international footballers
German footballers
German people of Kosovan descent
German people of Albanian descent
Oberliga (football) players
Regionalliga players
3. Liga players
1. FC Kaiserslautern II players
Hannover 96 II players
FC Rot-Weiß Koblenz players
SC Verl players
SV Elversberg players